The Classical Gymnasium is  a gymnasium high school (similar to a grammar school in England and Wales) situated in Zagreb, Croatia. It was founded by the Society of Jesus in 1607. In its first year it had 260 students and it operated on the basis of the Jesuit programme "Ratio atque institutio studiorum societatis Jesu".

History
It was founded in 1607 by the Jesuits, who had recently settled in the Kingdom of Croatia (Habsburg) and Slavonia within the Habsburg monarchy. The gymnasium began operation on the initiative of the Zagreb City Council, with the approval of the Croatian Parliament (Sabor) and strong support of Ban of Croatia Ivan Drašković. Jesuit Ivan Žanić became its first rector, with 260 students enrolling in its first year. The gymnasium official opened on June 3, 1607, in a ceremony attended by Bishop of Zagreb Šimun Bratulić, ban Ivan Drašković and others. On the day of the opening ceremony, a Latin Language drama "Actio comica" was staged, in which the young actors celebrated the beauties of their homeland, with the tradition being kep continuously to this day.

The philosophy department was established in 1662, and opened on 3 November. The department was given university privileges by Emperor Leopold in Ebersdorf on 23 October 1669, which saw the founding of the University of Zagreb.

WWII Ustaše transit camp for Jews 
In August 1942, the Zagreb police of the Croatian fascist, ultranationalist Ustaše regime arrested 1,200 Jews and held them in the Classical Gymnasium which was them empty because of Summer holidays. Some of the Jews tried to commit suicide in the school. The Ustaše later took them to the Main Zagreb Railway Station, from where they were shipped to the Auschwitz concentration camp

Damage during the war in the 90s
The school's back yard was hit by an Orkan rocket on 2 May 1995 during the rocket attack on Zagreb in the Croatian War of Independence. The attack was noted in the trial judgement in the Martic case at the ICTY. The attack occurred during class-time which prevented many casualties which would have occurred had it been break-time, during which students roam the back yard on warm May days. The damage was soon repaired.

Programme

The program, lasting four years, is based on combining classical education, with emphasis on humanities (namely languages including Latin and Ancient Greek, philosophy, literature, history, fine arts, music and theatre), with sciences and extracurricular activities.

Pupils study five languages: Latin, Ancient Greek, Croatian, English and one additional foreign language. They also  study Croatian and World Literature, Mathematics, Physics, Chemistry, Biology, Geography, IT, History, Fine Arts, Music, Philosophy, Logic, Politics and Economy, Sociology, Psychology and attend exercise classes. Most of these subjects are taught for 4 years. Pupils are free to choose additional subjects on top of the compulsory ones, such as Religious studies, Ethics, and additional foreign languages.

The school has additional classes on alternate Saturdays. Pupils take on extra-curricular activities including ancient drama, choir singing, pottery, educational travel, and public speaking. The school's drama group stage one classic ancient play each year which usually premières in a Zagreb theatre.

Although originally following a Christian educational model, today's school is a completely secular institution comparable to English grammar schools. During the communist Yugoslav regime, in 1977 the name "gymnasium" was banned and the school became the Educational Language Center, but it preserved its spirit and the classical programme (including tuition of Latin and Ancient Greek languages).

400th anniversary
During the 2006/2007 school year, the school celebrated its 400th anniversary with educational, historical, and entertaining festivities which include symposia and speeches, charity rock concerts, three Greek plays and open days.

Notable students

17th century
Fran Krsto Frankopan
Juraj Habdelić
Pavao Ritter Vitezović
Ivan III Drašković
Petar Petretić
Ivan Zakmardi

18th century
Ivan Franjo Čikulin
Baltazar Adam Krčelić
Mihalj Šilobod Bolšić
Tituš Brezovački

19th century
Dimitrija Demeter
August Šenoa
Janko Drašković
Ante Starčević
Vatroslav Jagić
Vatroslav Lisinski
Ivo Vojnović

20th century
Stjepan Radić
Miroslav Krleža
Antun Gustav Matoš

Notable professors
Juraj Habdelić
Maksimilijan Vrhovac
Matija Petar Katančić

Sources

Povijest

External links

Educational institutions established in the 1600s
Schools in Croatia
Education in Zagreb
Donji grad, Zagreb
Gymnasiums in Croatia